Wielkopole may refer to the following places:
Wielkopole, Łódź Voivodeship (central Poland)
Wielkopole, Krasnystaw County in Lublin Voivodeship (east Poland)
Wielkopole, Włodawa County in Lublin Voivodeship (east Poland)
Wielkopole, Jędrzejów County in Świętokrzyskie Voivodeship (south-central Poland)
Wielkopole, Włoszczowa County in Świętokrzyskie Voivodeship (south-central Poland)
Wielkopole, Greater Poland Voivodeship (west-central Poland)